Henriette von Paalzow, née Wach (1788, in Berlin – 30 October 1847, in Berlin) was a German historical novelist.

Henriette Wach was the sister of the painter Karl Wilhelm Wach. She married a Prussian officer, Major Paalzow, in 1816, though the marriage was dissolved in 1821. Her historical novels were compared to those of Walter Scott.

Works
 (anon.) Godwie-Castle, 3 vols, 1838
 St. Roche, 3 vols, 1839. Translated into English by James Justinian Morier as St. Roche. A romance, from the German, 1847
 Thomas Thurnau, 3 vols, 1843. Translated into English by Mary Howitt as The citizen of Prage, 1846.
 Jakob van der Rees, 1844

References

External links

1788 births
1847 deaths
German historical novelists
German women novelists
19th-century German women writers
19th-century German writers
Women historical novelists